S.S.C. Napoli only just failed to defend its inaugural Serie A title, finishing three points behind A.C. Milan. Napoli proved to be the most offensive team in the entire league, with Careca and Diego Maradona dominating the scoring charts. Due to Milan's strong defence that was not enough for the title, and due to a 3-2 defeat at home to the eventual champions, the title defence got out of reach.

Squad

Transfers

Winter

Competitions

Serie A

League table

Results by round

Matches

Topscorers
  Diego Maradona 15
  Careca 12
  Bruno Giordano 8
  Salvatore Bagni 3
  Andrea Carnevale 2

Coppa Italia 

First round 

Eightfinals

Quarterfinals

European Cup 

Round of 16

Statistics

Players statistics

References

Sources
  RSSSF - Italy 1987/88

S.S.C. Napoli seasons
Napoli